Calathus vivesi is a species of ground beetle from the Platyninae subfamily that is endemic to Spain.

References

vivesi
Beetles described in 1966
Endemic fauna of Spain
Beetles of Europe